Modern pentathlon at the 1996 Summer Olympics. Only an individual competition was held; the team event was removed by the International Olympic Committee after the previous games. The competition was significantly changed compared to 1992, with athletes now competing over a single day instead of 4–6 days to generate more fan interest.

Final results

References

External links
Official Olympic Report

1996 Summer Olympics events
1996
Men's events at the 1996 Summer Olympics